The charge-transfer amplifier (CTA) is an electronic amplifier circuit. Also known as transconveyance amplifiers, CTAs amplify electronic signals by dynamically conveying charge between capacitive nodes in proportion to the size of a differential input voltage. By appropriately selecting the relative node capacitances, voltage amplification occurs by the charge-voltage relationship of capacitors. CTAs are clocked, or sampling, amplifiers. They consume zero static power and can be designed to consume (theoretically) arbitrarily low dynamic power, proportional to the size of input signals being sampled. CMOS technology is most commonly used for implementation. CTAs were introduced in memory circuits in the 1970s, and more recently have been applied in multi-bit analog-to-digital converters (ADCs). They are also used in dynamic voltage comparator circuits.

See also
Comparator
Mixed-signal integrated circuit
Charge amplifier

References 

Electronic amplifiers